Andrew Ross (born 17 February 1878, date of death unknown) was a Scottish professional footballer who played as a winger. He played in the English Football League for Burnley.

References

1878 births
Year of death unknown
Scottish footballers
Association football wingers
Barrow A.F.C. players
Burnley F.C. players
English Football League players